Matsondana is a town and commune in Madagascar. It belongs to the district of Befandriana-Nord, which is a part of Sofia Region. The population of the commune was estimated to be approximately 40,000 in 2001 commune census.

Matsondana is served by a local airport. Primary and junior level secondary education are available in town. The majority 54% of the population of the commune are farmers, while an additional 43% receives their livelihood from raising livestock. The most important crops are rice and vanilla; also beans are an important agricultural product. Services provide employment for 3% of the population.

References and notes 

Populated places in Sofia Region